Sofie Bloch-Sørensen (born 19 May 1986) is a Danish handball player for Frederiksberg IF and the Danish  national team.

References

1986 births
Living people
Danish female handball players